Scolari is an Italian surname, and may refer to:

Fred Scolari, American basketball player
Giuseppe Scolari, Venetian artist of the 16th century, notably in woodcut
Luiz Felipe Scolari, Brazilian football coach
Peter Scolari, American actor
Pipo of Ozora, also known as Filippo Scolari or Lo Scolari
Pope Clement III, born as Paulino Scolari
Rosa Chiarina Scolari, Italian nun who helped the Italian Resistance in World War II

See also
Scolari's Food and Drug, a supermarket chain